1021 (MXXI) is a number in the 1000s number range.

1021  or variation may also refer to:

Chronology
 1021 CE, A.D. 1021, the 1021st year of the Common Era
 1021 BCE, 1021 B.C., the 1021st year before the Common Era

Places
 1021 Flammario, the 1021st asteroid catalogued

Legislation
 United Nations Security Council Resolution 1021
 Philippine Proclamation 1021

Objects by number
 , US Navy destroyer escort #1021
 German submarine U-1021, Nazi Germany Kriegsmarine U-boat #1021
 Falcon 9 booster B1021, SpaceX Falcon 9 first stage booster core #1021
 Farman F.1021, an experimental aircraft from 1930s France

Other uses
 Code page 1021 (CH7DEC), a computer character set, the Swiss variant of DEC's National Replacement Character Set (NRCS)

See also
 

 21 (disambiguation)